This is a list of released and upcoming video games developed in Spain. The list is sorted by game title, platform, year of release, their developer and their publisher

References

Video games developed in Spain
Spain
Video games developed